Gabriela is the Portuguese, Spanish, Czech, Slovak, Romanian, Latvian, Polish and Bulgarian feminine form of the Hebrew name Gabriel.

List of people with the given name Gabriela

Entertainment
Gabriela Anders (born 1972), Argentine singer and pianist
Gabriela Beňačková (born 1947), Slovak soprano opera singer
Gabriela Böhm (born 1964), Argentinian independent documentary filmmaker
Monique Gabriela Curnen (born 1970), American film and television actress
Gabriela Duarte (born 1974), Brazilian actress
Maria Gabriela de Faría Chacón (born 1992), Venezuelan television actress and singer
Gabriela Flores, Argentine television and film actress
Gabriela Lena Frank (born 1972), American composer of contemporary classical music and pianist
Gabriela Frías (born 1971), Mexican journalist and business anchor for CNN en Español and host of En Efectivo
Gabriela Irimia (born 1982), Romanian singer and member of pop music duo The Cheeky Girls with her twin sister Monica
Gabriela Isler (born 1988), Venezuelan beauty pageant titleholder who won Miss Universe 2013
Gabriela Kownacka (1952–2010), Polish television, film and theatre actress
Gabriela Kulka (born 1979), Polish musician
Gabriela Markus (born 1988), Brazilian model
Gabriela Montero (born 1970), Venezuelan-American pianist
Gabriela Moyseowicz (born 1944), Polish composer and pianist
Gabriela N (born 1993), Maltese singer/songwriter
Gabriela Ortiz (born 1964), Mexican music educator and composer
Gabriela Palacio Díaz de León (born 1989), Mexican winner of the 2010 Nuestra Belleza Internacional México beauty pageant
Gabriela Quintero, Mexican guitarist of the duo Rodrigo y Gabriela
Gabriela Robin, pseudonym of musician Yoko Kanno
Gabriela Scherer (born 1981), Swiss mezzo-soprano opera singer
Gabriela Spanic Utrera (born 1973), Venezuelan actress
Cecilia Gabriela Vera Sandoval (born 1961), Mexican actress
Gabriela Vergara Aranguren (born 1974), Venezuelan model and telenovela actress
Gabriela Villalba (born 1985), Ecuadorian singer and actress

Politics and history
Gabriela Crețu (born 1965), Romanian politician and Member of the European Parliament with the Social Democratic Party (PSD) and the Party of European Socialists
Gabriela Cuevas Barron (born 1979), Mexican politician with the National Action Party (PAN) who has served as a federal deputy of the Mexican Congress from 2000 to 2003 and 2009 to 2012
Gabriela Konevska-Trajkovska (1971–2010), Macedonian politician who served as the country's Deputy Prime Minister for European Affairs from 2006 until 2008
Gabriela Masłowska (born 1950), Polish politician and member of Sejm from 2001 to 2007
Gabriela Ngirmang (1922–2007), Palauan peace and anti-nuclear activist
Gabriela Rosa (born 1966), American politician
Gabriela Shalev (born 1941), Israeli ambassador to the United Nations from 2008 to 2011
María Josefa Gabriela Silang (1731–1763), wife of Ilocano insurgent leader Diego Silang in the Philippines
Gabriela Silva Leite, Brazilian retired prostitute, sociologist and founder of NGO Davida
Archduchess Gabriela von Habsburg (born 1956), Georgian ambassador to Germany

Sports
Gabriela Andersen-Schiess (b. 1945), Swiss long-distance runner
Gabriela Dabrowski (b. 1992), Canadian tennis player
Gabriela Drăgoi (b. 1992), Romanian artistic gymnast
Gabriela Grillo (b. 1952), German equestrian 
Gabriela Liz (b. 1961), field hockey player from Argentina
Gabriela Marginean (b. 1987), Romanian professional basketball player
Gabriela Medina Solórzano (b. 1985), Mexican sprinter
Gabriela Navrátilová (b. 1976), tennis player from the Czech Republic
Gabriela Ņikitina (b. 1994), Latvian swimmer
Gabriela Paz Franco (b. 1991), Venezuelan tennis player
Gabriela Pando (b. 1970), Argentine field hockey player
Gabriela Pérez del Solar Cuculiza (b. 1968), Peruvian volleyball player
Gabriela Potorac (b. 1973), Romanian artistic gymnast 
Gabriela Sabatini (b. 1970), Argentine tennis player
Gabriela Stacherová (b. 1980), Slovak slalom canoer who
Gabriela Svobodová (b. 1953), Czech cross country skier
Gabriela Szabo (b. 1975), Romanian track and field athlete
Gabriela Trușcă (b. 1957), Romanian artistic gymnast and coach
María Gabriela Pazos (b. 1967), Argentine field hockey player
Gabriela Sánchez Grossi (b. 1962), Argentine field hockey player

Literature and art
Gabriela Adameșteanu (born 1942), Romanian novelist, short story writer, essayist, journalist, and translator
Gabriela Brimmer (1947–2000), Mexican writer and activist for people with disabilities who were born with cerebral palsy
Gabriela Bustelo (born 1962), Spanish neorealist novelist and translator
Gabriela Dauerer (born 1958), German painter
Gabríela Friðriksdóttir (born 1971), Icelandic artist and sculptor
Gabriela Mistral (1889–1957), pseudonym of Lucila de María del Perpetuo Socorro Godoy Alcayaga, Chilean poet, educator, diplomat, feminist and winner of the 1945 Nobel Prize in Literature
Gabriela Mistral Inter-American Prize for Culture, award by the Organization of American States from 1979 to 2000 in her memory
Gabriela Preissová (1862–1946), pen name of Matylda Dumontová, Czech writer and playwright
Maria Gabriela Stefania Korwin-Piotrowska (1857–1921), known as Gabriela Zapolska, Polish novelist, playwright, and stage actress

Science
 Gabriela Basařová (1934–2019), professor of chemistry who researched fermentation chemistry, brewing, and malting

See also
Gabriella (given name)

Portuguese feminine given names
Romanian feminine given names
Spanish feminine given names